A letterhead is the heading at the top of a sheet of letter paper (stationery). It consists of a name, address, logo or trademark, and sometimes a background pattern.

Overview
Many companies and individuals prefer to create a letterhead template in a word processor or other software application.  That generally includes the same information as pre-printed stationery but at lower cost.  Letterhead can then be printed on stationery or plain paper, as needed, on a local output device or sent electronically.

Letterheads are generally printed by either the offset or letterpress methods.  In most countries outside North America, company letterheads are printed A4 in size (210 mm x 297 mm). In North America, the letter size is typically 8.5 x 11 inches (215 x 280 mm).

Although modern technology makes letterheads very easy to imitate, they continue to be used as evidence of authenticity.

Gallery

See also 
 Document
 Documentation

References

Further reading 
 Wheeler, Alina. Designing Brand Identity, 2012, pp. 146–147.

External links 

 Gallery of historic letterheads

Letters (message)